Mark T. Sheehan High School is a public high school located at 142 Hope Hill Road, Wallingford, Connecticut. It is part of the Wallingford Public School System, and one of two public high schools in Wallingford, Lyman Hall High School being the other. Its official colors are burgundy and gold.

History 

Sheehan is known for having started the tradition known as powderpuff. The first powderpuff game was played in Wallingford between Sheehan and Lyman Hall. The School is named after Dr. Mark T. Sheehan, a medical officer during World War I, he had also practiced medicine in Wallingford and was known to never deny service to anyone including patients who could not afford care.

References

Buildings and structures in Wallingford, Connecticut
Schools in New Haven County, Connecticut
Public high schools in Connecticut
1971 establishments in Connecticut
Educational institutions established in 1971